The Immortal Vagabond is a 1930 German musical film directed by Gustav Ucicky and Joe May and starring Liane Haid, Gustav Fröhlich and Hans Adalbert Schlettow. It is an operetta film, made by German's largest film company UFA. Interiors were shot at the Babelsberg Studios in Berlin. The film's sets were designed by Robert Herlth and Walter Röhrig. The film was remade in 1953.

Cast
Liane Haid as Anna 'Annerl'
Gustav Fröhlich as Hans Ritter
Hans Adalbert Schlettow as Franz Lechner
Karl Gerhardt as tour guide
Attila Hörbiger
Paul Hörbiger
Ernst Behmer
Julius Falkenstein
Jaro Fürth
Lutz Götz
Fritz Greiner
Paul Henckels
Karl Platen
Georg H. Schnell
Oskar Sima
Eugen Thiele
Hermann Thimig
Weiß Ferdl
Rudolf Teubler
Rudolf Meinhard-Jünger

References

External links

Films of the Weimar Republic
German musical films
1930 musical films
Films directed by Joe May
Films directed by Gustav Ucicky
Films based on operettas
Operetta films
UFA GmbH films
Films produced by Joe May
German black-and-white films
Films scored by Ralph Benatzky
Films scored by Edmund Eysler
1930s German films
Films shot at Babelsberg Studios